Two vessels of the Royal Navy have been named HMS Begonia after the flower.

  was an  sloop launched in 1915, converted to a Q-ship and sunk in a collision with a German submarine off Casablanca in 1917.
The ship was sold into civilian service in 1946.

References
 
 
 

Royal Navy ship names